Events in the year 2021 in Greece.

Incumbents
President: Katerina Sakellaropoulou 
Prime Minister: Kyriakos Mitsotakis

Events
Ongoing: COVID-19 pandemic in Greece
4 February - March: Anti-government protests against university police, police brutality and mishandling of COVID-19 pandemic and in solidarity with Dimitris Koufontinas' hunger strike.
3 March: 2021 Larissa earthquake
August: Wildfires engulf parts of Athens, the island of Euboea and parts of the Peloponnese.
27 September: 2021 Crete earthquake

Scheduled events 
The 2021 Population and Housing Census is planned to be conducted by the Hellenic Statistical Authority.

Deaths
 

11 January – Vassilis Alexakis, Greek-born French writer and translator (born 1943).
12 January – Theodoros Mitras, politician, MP (born 1948).
14  January – Leonidas Pelekanakis, sailor (born 1962).
24 January – Sifis Valirakis, politician and anti-junta activist, Minister of Public Order (born 1943).
?? February – Maria Kastrisianaki, broadcaster (born 1948).
11 February – Antonis Kalogiannis, singer (born 1940).
9 April – Giorgos Karaivaz, Star Channel journalist, shot dead in Alimos, South Athens
8 July – Giorgos Dalakouras, politician and shipping line owner, former Civil Administrator of Mount Athos (born 1938).
2 September - Mikis Theodorakis, musician and composer (born 1925).

References

 
2020s in Greece
Years of the 21st century in Greece
Greece
Greece